Aceria chondrillae (chondrilla gall mite, skeletonweed gall mite) is a gall forming deuterogynous, eriophyid (mite) often used as a biological control of the noxious weed, Chondrilla juncea (Rush skeletonweed), a highly competitive herbaceous perennial composite found in Europe, Asia, Australia and North America.

Biological description
At maturity, mites are yellowish orange in colour, with females ranging from 0.19-0.26 mm in length with the males slightly smaller at, 0.165-0.180 mm. Except for genitalia male and female mites are externally similar. Larvae are smaller than the adults and distinguished by a humpback and exhibit no external genitalia. Eggs are soft, round, 0.04mm in diameter and at first colorless but later light orange. Mite growth and development is dependent on environmental and climatic conditions. A. chondrillae have an average generation cycle of 10 days.

Impact on chondrilla
The chondrilla plant exhibits galls when infested by A. chondrillae. These galls appear as clusters of tiny, hyperplastic buds reaching a size of 1.5–2 cm in diameter, and in some cases up to 5 cm. Hundreds of mites can be contained within each gall.

The development of the galls impede the health, growth, and reproduction abilities of the plant by:
 destroying the flower buds in gall formation, reducing and suppressing seed production.
 compromising the apical shoots, resulting in a diminished regenerative capacity. Particularly efficacious in plants infested early, gall formations block shoot development on the apical growing points, stunting growth, distorting adjacent stems, associated foliage and in some cases causing death. 
 weakening the plant through the presence and production of large galls. The plant often turns yellow early from premature decline.
 
A. chondrillae has been recognized to affect plants of the Chondrilla genus: C. juncea, C. juncea f. acantholepis, C. brevirostris and C. leiosperma.

Use as a biological control 
Aceria chondrillae is often used as a biological control for the perennial herb skeleton weed (Chondrilla juncea) present in Europe, North America and Australia. It was introduced to Australia in 1971 as part of a program to suppress skeleton weed in areas where it dominates the landscape.

Predators 
Only one predator of the Chondrilla gall mite has been observed in nature. The Phytoseiid predatory mite, Amblyseius sp., lives in the galls made by Aceria chondrillae and exists in all Mediterranean areas where Aceria chondrillae has been found. Populations are small and have little effect on A. chondrillae numbers.

References 

Eriophyidae
Invasive plants biological control agents
Arachnids of Asia
Animals described in 1891